The Brahms guitar, or cello-guitar, is an eight-string guitar with a conventional resonating body, but also an external, box-shaped resonator. Classical guitarist Paul Galbraith, in collaboration with  luthier David Rubio, invented the instrument in 1994. David Rubio's protégé, luthier Martin Woodhouse, innovated the design and continues to build Brahms guitars. Galbraith originally conceived it specifically to perform Johannes Brahms' Theme and Variations, Op. 21.

The instrument adds two strings to the standard six—a low A (a 5th below the standard low E), and a high A (a 4th above the standard high E), giving A E A D G B E A. The guitar's frets are fanned to allow for the different string lengths. The player holds the guitar like a cello, with a cello-like post from the bottom of the guitar to the box resonator.

Other adopters include Joseph Ehrenpreis, Everton Gloeden, Luiz Mantovani of the Brazilian Guitar Quartet, and Galbraith's former students Redmond O'Toole and Matthew Korbanic. The Dublin Guitar Quartet uses the instrument in their arrangements of  Philip Glass, Kevin Volans, and Arvo Part string quartets.

In November of 2020, Joseph Ehrenpreis released "New Music with Brahms Guitar, Vol. 1" funded by an IAS grant from the Illinois Arts Council. The project includes entirely new compositions from an international cast of composers, including Dai Fujikura, written specifically for the 8-string Brahms Guitar.

See also
Classical guitar making

References

Sources
 Paul Galbraith's website

Guitars
1994 introductions